Klaudia Alagierska (born ) is a Polish volleyball player. She is part of the Poland women's national volleyball team.

She participated in the  2017 FIVB Volleyball World Grand Prix, 2018 Montreux Volley Masters, and 2018 FIVB Volleyball Women's Nations League.
On club level she played for ŁKS Commercecon Łódź.

References

External links 

 CEV profile

1996 births
Living people
Polish women's volleyball players
People from Milanówek